Tshepiso "Sox" Molwantwa (born October 17, 1978, in Botswana) is a Botswana football striker currently playing for Notwane FC.  He is a member of the Botswana national football team.

Molwanta was part of the Botswana side at the 1995 African U-17 Championship in Mali. He along with his teammates were promoted to Botswana's under-23 national team and then the senior national team.

References

External links 

1978 births
Living people
Botswana footballers
Association football forwards
Notwane F.C. players
Botswana international footballers